The 2019 Sokoto State gubernatorial election occurred in Nigeria on March 9, 2019. Incumbent Sokoto State Governor Aminu Tambuwal won re-election for a second term, defeating Ahmad Aliyu of the APC and several minor party candidates.

Aminu Tambuwal was returned as the PDP candidate with Manir Dan Iya as his running mate. Ahmad Aliyu was the APC candidate with Faruk Malami Yabo as his running mate. 51 candidates contested in the election.

Electoral system
The Governor of Sokoto State is elected using the plurality voting system.

Primary election

PDP primary
Aminu Tambuwal was returned as the PDP candidate with Manir Dan Iya as his running mate.

APC primary
The APC primary election was held on September 30, 2018. Ahmad Aliyu won the primary election polling 2,282 votes against 3 other candidates. His closest rival was Faruk Yabo who came second with 837 votes, Abubakar Gumbi, came third with 70 votes, while Abubakar Gada had 20 votes.

Results
A total number of 51 candidates registered with the Independent National Electoral Commission to contest in the election.

The total number of registered voters in the state was 1,887,767, while 1,083,413 voters were accredited. Total number of votes cast was 1,067,990, while number of valid votes was 1,036,336. Rejected votes were 31,662.

By local government area
Here are the results of the election by local government area for the two major parties. The total valid votes of 1,036,336 represents the 51 political parties that participated in the election. Green represents LGAs won by Aminu Tambuwal. Blue represents LGAs won by Ahmad Aliyu.

References 

Sokoto State gubernatorial election
Sokoto State gubernatorial election
Sokoto State gubernatorial elections
2019 Sokoto State elections